Philip Bowes is an English professional boxer. He held the Commonwealth super-lightweight title from 2019 to 2020 and challenged for the British super-lightweight title in 2020.

Professional career
Bowes made his professional debut on 8 October 2011, scoring a four-round points decision (PTS) over Billy Smith at the York Hall in London.

After compiling a record of 9–0 (2 KO), he faced Joe Hughes for the vacant Southern Area super-lightweight title on 11 October 2014 at the O2 Arena, London, losing via technical knockout (TKO) in the tenth and final round. He made a second attempt for the vacant Southern Area title seven months later on 16 May 2015 at the York Hall, losing by points decision to former Prizefighter champion Johnny Coyle.

Following six consecutive PTS wins, he then faced Glenn Foot on 27 May 2017 for the vacant English super-lightweight title at the York Hall. Bowes lost in his third attempt for a British regional title via unanimous decision (UD) over ten rounds, with all three judges scoring the bout 95–93.

Following three points decision wins, he fought Benson Nyilawila on 2 February 2019 for the vacant Commonwealth super-lightweight title at the York Hall. In his fourth attempt at a professional title, Bowes won with a second-round TKO. The first defence of his Commonwealth title came a month later on 30 March, against Tom Farrell at the M&S Bank Arena (formerly Echo Arena) in Liverpool. The fight was aired live on Sky Sports in the UK and DAZN in the United States as part of the undercard for Liam Smith vs. Sam Eggington. Bowes successfully retained his title by unanimous decision, with the judges' scorecards reading 118–110, 118–111 and 117–112. Bowes was set to make the second defence of his Commonwealth title against Akeem Ennis-Brown on 29 November 2019 at the York Hall, with the vacant British super-lightweight title also on the line. The day before the fight, it was announced the bout had been cancelled due to the British Boxing Board of Control declaring Bowes medically unfit to fight. Bowes explained on social media; "...the doctor and Boxing Board of Control have ordered my British title fight tonight to be rescheduled due to me having blood in my urine which has come back as a result that I can not fight now. My health is most important so that’s my priority." The fight was then rescheduled for 20 March 2020 but was cancelled again, this time due to the COVID-19 pandemic.

Professional boxing record

References

Living people
Year of birth missing (living people)
Date of birth missing (living people)
English male boxers
Boxers from Greater London
Light-welterweight boxers
Commonwealth Boxing Council champions